Events in the year 1642 in Norway.

Incumbents
Monarch: Christian IV

Events
thumb|right |150 px|Hannibal Sehested
April  - Hannibal Sehested was appointed Governor-General of Norway.

Arts and literature

Births

Deaths
8 January – Niels Toller, merchant (born c. 1592).

See also

References